Cristian Hadžiosmanović (born 9 July 1998) is an Italian-born Montenegrin footballer who plays as a defender for Italian  club Potenza.

Club career
He made his Serie C debut for Livorno on 22 October 2017 in a game against Giana Erminio.

On 24 July 2019, he joined Serie C club Monopoli on loan.

On 12 September 2020 he moved on loan to Casertana.

On 5 August 2021, he moved to Serie C club Teramo on a permanent basis, signing a one-year deal.

On 19 July 2022, Hadžiosmanović signed with Fidelis Andria.

On 3 January 2023, Hadžiosmanović joined Potenza on a contract until 30 June 2024.

References

External links
 
 

1998 births
Living people
Sportspeople from Lecce
Footballers from Apulia
Italian people of Montenegrin descent
Montenegrin footballers
Montenegro youth international footballers
Association football defenders
Serie C players
A.C. Milan players
U.C. Sampdoria players
U.S. Livorno 1915 players
Reggina 1914 players
Vis Pesaro dal 1898 players
S.S. Monopoli 1966 players
Casertana F.C. players
S.S. Teramo Calcio players
S.S. Fidelis Andria 1928 players
Potenza Calcio players
Montenegrin expatriate footballers
Montenegrin expatriate sportspeople in Italy
Expatriate footballers in Italy